Isochariesthes tripunctata is a species of beetle in the family Cerambycidae. It was described by Per Olof Christopher Aurivillius in 1903. It is known from Gabon, Cameroon, the Republic of the Congo, the Democratic Republic of the Congo, and Equatorial Guinea.

References

tripunctata
Beetles described in 1903